The 2014 MTV Video Music Awards were held on August 24, 2014 at The Forum in Inglewood, California. It was the 31st annual MTV Video Music Awards. Beyoncé and Iggy Azalea led the nominees with eight nominations each, while Eminem followed them with seven. Beyoncé received the Michael Jackson Video Vanguard Award, following a 16-minute medley of her self-titled fifth studio album. The show had an audience of 8.3 million viewers, while 10.1 million cumulative with the other three Viacom networks that simulcast the presentation.

Performances

House artist
 DJ Mustard

Presenters

Pre-show 
Lucy Hale and Sway – hosts
Lucy Hale – presented Best Lyric Video
Christina Garibaldi – red carpet
Ingrid Nilsen and Becky G – fashion correspondents

Main show 
 Gwen Stefani and Snoop Dogg – presented Best Female Video
 Jay Pharoah – performed a short stand-up routine and spoke about Artist to Watch voting procedures
 Lorde – introduced Taylor Swift
 Chelsea Handler – presented Best Male Video
 Jay Pharoah as Jay-Z – again performed a short stand-up routine and spoke about Artist to Watch voting procedures
 Jim Carrey and Jeff Daniels – presented Best Pop Video
 Kim Kardashian West – introduced Sam Smith
 Common – spoke about the situation in Ferguson, Missouri, and presented Best Hip-Hop Video
 Jay Pharoah as Kanye West – again performed a short stand-up routine and spoke about Artist to Watch voting procedures
 Uzo Aduba, Laverne Cox and Taylor Schilling – introduced Usher and Nicki Minaj
 Nina Dobrev and Trey Songz – presented Best Rock Video
 Chloë Grace Moretz and Dylan O'Brien – introduced 5 Seconds of Summer
 Jay Pharoah – presented Artist to Watch
 Jennifer Lopez – introduced Iggy Azalea and Rita Ora
 Demi Lovato and Jason Derulo – introduced Maroon 5
 Jimmy Fallon – presented Video of the Year
 Jay-Z and Blue Ivy Carter – presented Video Vanguard Award

Winners and nominees
The nominations were announced on July 17, 2014. Winners are in bold text.

Video of the Year
Miley Cyrus – "Wrecking Ball"
 Iggy Azalea (featuring Charli XCX) – "Fancy"
 Beyoncé (featuring Jay-Z) – "Drunk in Love"
 Sia – "Chandelier"
 Pharrell Williams – "Happy"

Best Male Video
Ed Sheeran (featuring Pharrell Williams) – "Sing"
 Eminem (featuring Rihanna) – "The Monster"
 John Legend – "All of Me"
 Sam Smith – "Stay with Me"
 Pharrell Williams – "Happy"

Best Female Video
Katy Perry (featuring Juicy J) – "Dark Horse"
 Iggy Azalea (featuring Charli XCX) – "Fancy"
 Beyoncé – "Partition"
 Ariana Grande (featuring Iggy Azalea) – "Problem"
 Lorde – "Royals"

Artist to Watch
Fifth Harmony – "Miss Movin' On"
 5 Seconds of Summer – "She Looks So Perfect"
 Charli XCX – "Boom Clap"
 Schoolboy Q – "Man of the Year"
 Sam Smith – "Stay with Me"

Best Pop Video
Ariana Grande (featuring Iggy Azalea) – "Problem"
 Avicii (featuring Aloe Blacc) – "Wake Me Up"
 Iggy Azalea (featuring Charli XCX) – "Fancy"
 Jason Derulo (featuring 2 Chainz) – "Talk Dirty"
 Pharrell Williams – "Happy"

Best Rock Video
Lorde – "Royals"
 Arctic Monkeys – "Do I Wanna Know?"
 The Black Keys – "Fever"
 Imagine Dragons – "Demons"
 Linkin Park – "Until It's Gone"

Best Hip-Hop Video
Drake (featuring Majid Jordan) – "Hold On, We're Going Home"
 Childish Gambino – "3005"
 Eminem – "Berzerk"
 Kanye West – "Black Skinhead"
 Wiz Khalifa – "We Dem Boyz"

MTV Clubland Award
Zedd (featuring Hayley Williams) – "Stay the Night"
 Disclosure – "Grab Her!"
 DJ Snake and Lil Jon – "Turn Down for What"
 Martin Garrix – "Animals"
 Calvin Harris – "Summer"

Best Collaboration
Beyoncé (featuring Jay-Z) – "Drunk in Love"
 Chris Brown (featuring Lil Wayne and Tyga) – "Loyal"
 Eminem (featuring Rihanna) – "The Monster"
 Ariana Grande (featuring Iggy Azalea) – "Problem"
 Katy Perry (featuring Juicy J) – "Dark Horse"
 Pitbull (featuring Kesha) – "Timber"

Best Direction
DJ Snake and Lil Jon – "Turn Down for What" (Directors: DANIELS)
 Beyoncé – "Pretty Hurts" (Director: Melina Matsoukas)
 Miley Cyrus – "Wrecking Ball" (Director: Terry Richardson)
 Eminem (featuring Rihanna) – "The Monster" (Director: Rich Lee)
 OK Go – "The Writing's on the Wall" (Directors: Damian Kulash, Aaron Duffy & Bob Partington)

Best Choreography
Sia – "Chandelier" (Choreographer: Ryan Heffington)
 Beyoncé – "Partition" (Choreographers: Svetlana Kostantinova, Philippe Decouflé, Danielle Polanco and Frank Gatson)
 Jason Derulo (featuring 2 Chainz) – "Talk Dirty" (Choreographer: Amy Allen)
 Michael Jackson and Justin Timberlake – "Love Never Felt So Good" (Choreographers: Rich and Tone Talauega)
 Kiesza – "Hideaway" (Choreographer: Ljuba Castot)
 Usher – "Good Kisser" (Choreographers: Jamaica Craft and Todd Sams)

Best Visual Effects
OK Go – "The Writing's on the Wall" (Visual Effects: 1stAveMachine)
 Disclosure – "Grab Her!" (Visual Effects: Mathematic and Emile Sornin)
 DJ Snake and Lil Jon – "Turn Down for What" (Visual Effects: DANIELS and Zak Stoltz)
 Eminem – "Rap God" (Visual Effects: Rich Lee, Louis Baker, Mammal Studios, Laundry! and Sunset Edit)
 Jack White – "Lazaretto" (Visual Effects: Mathematic and Jonas & François)

Best Art Direction
Arcade Fire – "Reflektor" (Art Director: Anastasia Masaro)
 Iggy Azalea (featuring Charli XCX) – "Fancy" (Art Director: David Courtemarche)
 DJ Snake and Lil Jon – "Turn Down for What" (Art Director: Jason Kisvarday)
 Eminem – "Rap God" (Art Director: Alex Pacion)
 Tyler, The Creator – "Tamale" (Art Director: Tom Lisowski)

Best Editing
Eminem – "Rap God" (Editor: Ken Mowe)
 Beyoncé – "Pretty Hurts" (Editor: Jeff Selis)
 Fitz and the Tantrums – "The Walker" (Editor: James Fitzpatrick)
 MGMT – "Your Life Is a Lie" (Editor: Erik Laroi)
 Zedd (featuring Hayley Williams) – "Stay the Night" (Editor: Daniel "Cloud" Campos)

Best Cinematography
Beyoncé – "Pretty Hurts" (Directors of Photography: Darren Lew and Jackson Hunt)
 Arcade Fire – "Afterlife" (Director of Photography: Evan Prosofsky)
 Lana Del Rey – "West Coast" (Director of Photography: Evan Prosofsky)
 Gesaffelstein – "Hate or Glory" (Director of Photography: Michael Ragen)
 Thirty Seconds to Mars – "City of Angels" (Director of Photography: David Devlin)

Best Video with a Social Message
Beyoncé – "Pretty Hurts"
 Avicii – "Hey Brother"
 J. Cole (featuring TLC) – "Crooked Smile"
 David Guetta (featuring Mikky Ekko) – "One Voice"
 Angel Haze (featuring Sia) – "Battle Cry"
 Kelly Rowland – "Dirty Laundry"

Best Lyric Video
5 Seconds of Summer – "Don't Stop"
 Ariana Grande (featuring Iggy Azalea) – "Problem"
 Demi Lovato (featuring Cher Lloyd) – "Really Don't Care"
 Austin Mahone (featuring Pitbull) – "Mmm Yeah"
 Katy Perry – "Birthday"

Michael Jackson Video Vanguard Award
Beyoncé

See also
 2014 MTV Europe Music Awards

References

External links
Official website

MTV Video Music Awards
MTV Video Music
MTV Video Music Awards
2014 in California
MTV Video Music Awards ceremonies
Shorty Award winners